Articles related to the field of motion pictures include:

0–9
180-degree rule – 
3D film – 
3Delight – 
3D LUT – 
3ds Max – 
4-point lighting setup – 
16 mm film – 
35 mm film – 
70 mm film –

A
Aa–Am

A and B editing – 
A roll – 
Aberration in optical settings – 
Above-the-line – 
Academy Awards – 
Academy of Motion Picture Arts and Sciences – 
Accelerated montage – 
Achromatic doublet – 
Acousmatic – 
Acting – 
Actinic light – 
Action axis – 
Actor – 
Actress – 
Actuality film – 
Adobe After Effects – 
Adobe Premiere Elements – 
Adobe Premiere Pro – 
AVS Video Converter – 
AVS Video Editor – 
Aerial image – 
Aerial shot – 
Aliasing – 
Alliance Atlantis – 
Alternate-frame sequencing – 
Ambient light – 
American Cinema Editors – 
American Federation of Television and Radio Artists – 
American Film Institute – 
American Indian Film Festival – 
American National Standards Institute – 
American night – 
American Society of Cinematographers – 
American shot

An–Az

Anamorphic – 
Angle of view – 
Angle plus angle – 
Angular resolution – 
Animation – 
Animation camera – 
Animation director – 
Animator – 
Anime – 
Answer print – 
Anti-aliasing filter – 
Apparatus theory – 
Aperture – 
A-Plot – 
Arc lamp – 
Arri – 
Arri bayonet – 
Arri PL – 
Arri standard – 
Arriflex D-20 – 
Art department – 
Art director – 
Art film – 
Artificial light – 
ASA – 
ASA speed rating – 
Aspect ratio (image) – 
Assistant director – 
Audio engineering – 
Audition – 
Auteur theory – 
Autoconform – 
Autodesk – 
Autoethnography – 
Autofocus – 
Automated dialogue replacement – 
Available light – 
Avar – 
Avid Technology – 
Axial cut – 
Axis of action –

B
B roll – 
Back light – 
Backlot – 
Background light – 
Background lighting – 
Bailin bracket – 
Balloon light – 
Barrel distortion – 
Barn doors – 
Bayer filter – 
Beat (filmmaking) -
Below-the-line – 
Best boy – 
Beta movement – 
Bigature – 
Billing – 
Bird's eye shot – 
Black-and-white – 
Blaxploitation – 
Bleach bypass – 
Blocking – 
Bluescreen – 
B-movie – 
Body double – 
Body makeup artist – 
Bolex – 
Bollywood – 
Boom operator – 
Boom shot – 
Boomerang (lighting) – 
Bounce board – 
Breaking down the script – 
Breathing (lens) – 
Brightness (lighting) – 
British Academy of Film and Television Arts – 
British Board of Film Classification – 
British Independent Film Awards – 
British Film Institute – 
Broadside (lighting) – 
Bronson Canyon – 
Burnt-in timecode – 
Butterfly (lighting)

C
Ca–Cm

C-Stand – 
Cahiers du cinéma – 
Callier effect – 
Cameo lighting – 
Cameo role – 
Cameo shot – 
Camera angle – 
Camera assistant – 
Camera boom – 
Camera crane – 
Camera crew – 
Camera Dolly – 
Camera magazine – 
Camera operator – 
Camera shot – 
Canadian pioneers in early Hollywood – 
Candles per square foot – 
Cannes Film Festival – 
Casting Agent – 
Casting – 
Casting couch – 
Catering – 
Celluloid Closet – 
Celluloid ceiling – 
César Award – 
Changing bag – 
Character animation – 
Charisma – 
Chiaroscuro – 
Choker shot – 
Chroma key – 
Chromatic aberration – 
Chronophotography – 
Cinelerra – 
Cinema 16 – 
CinemaDNG – 
Cinemaphile – 
CineMagic – 
Cinemascope – 
Cinematheque – 
Cinematic techniques – 
Cinematographer – 
Cinematography – 
Cinéma vérité – 
Cineon – 
CinePaint – 
Cinerama – 
Circle of confusion – 
Circle-Vision 360 – 
Clapperboard – 
Clapper loader – 
Close shot – 
Close-up – 
Closed captioning – 
Closing credits

Cn–Cz

Cold open – 
Color conversion filter – 
Color corrected fluorescent light – 
Color correction – 
Color gel – 
Color grading – 
Color rendering index – 
Color timer – 
Colour-separation overlay – 
Columbia Pictures – 
Compositing – 
Composition – 
Computer-generated imagery – 
Continuity – 
Continuity editing – 
Continuity clerk – 
Cooke triplet lens – 
Costume design – 
Costume designer – 
Costume drama – 
Costume supervisor – 
Costumer – 
Crafts service – 
Crane shot – 
Crashbox – 
Creative Artists Agency – 
Creative geography – 
Cross cutting – 
Cross lighting – 
Cross-dressing in film and television – 
Cue (theatrical) – 
Cult film – 
Cutaway – 
Cut in – 
Cutting on action

D
Daily editor log – 
Daily rushes – 
Dance film – 
Day for night – 
Deadspot (lighting) – 
Deep focus – 
Depth of field – 
Depth-of-field adapter – 
Development – 
Development hell – 
Dialogue editor – 
Dichroic lenses – 
Diegetic sound – 
Diffraction – 
Diffuser (lighting) – 
Digital audio – 
Digital audio tape recorder – 
Digital audio workstation – 
Digital cinema – 
Digital Cinema Initiatives – 
Digital cinematography – 
Digital compositing – 
Digital film – 
Digital grading – 
Digital image processing – 
Digital intermediate – 
Digital Light Processing – 
Digital negative – 
Digital projection – 
Digital Theatre System – 
Digital video – 
Digital Visual Interface – 
Digital zoom – 
Dimmer (lighting) – 
Direct broadcast satellite – 
Direct to Disk Recording – 
Director (film) – 
Director's cut – 
Directors Guild of America – 
Dissolve (film) – 
DMX (lighting) – 
Docudrama – 
Documentary film – 
Dolby Digital – 
Dolly grip – 
Dolly shot – 
Dolly zoom – 
Double-system recording – 
Douser (lighting) – 
DPX file format – 
Drawn on film animation – 
Dream sequence – 
DreamWorks – 
DreamWorks Animation – 
Drug movies – 
Dubbing – 
Dutch angle – 
DV – 
DVD – 
Dynamic composition – 
Dykstraflex –

E

Eclair camera – 
Edge code – 
Edit decision list – 
Editor's cut – 
Effects light – 
Electrotachyscope – 
Ellipsoidal – 
Ellipsoidal reflector spot light – 
End credits – 
Entertainment law – 
Eroticism in film – 
Establishing shot – 
Evangelion shot – 
Executive producer (motion picture) – 
Experimental filmmaker – 
Exposure latitude – 
Expressionism (film) – 
Extra – 
Extreme close-up shot – 
Extreme long shot – 
Eye-level camera angle – 
Eyepiece –

F
Fade-in – 
Fade-out – 
Fan film – 
Fast cutting – 
Fast motion – 
Feminist film theory – 
Field of view – 
Fill light – 
Film – 
Film Academy – 
Film colorization – 
Film crew – 
Film critic – 
Film criticism – 
Film director – 
Film distributor – 
Film editing – 
Film editor – 
Film festival – 
Film format – 
Film gate – 
Film genre – 
Film institutes – 
Film leader – 
Filmmaking – 
Film modification – 
Film noir – 
Film-out – 
Film plane – 
Film preservation – 
Film production – 
Film producer – 
Film punctuation – 
Film rating systems – 
Film recorder – 
Film restoration – 
Film scanner – 
Film school – 
Film score – 
Film speed – 
Film stock – 
Film styles – 
Film technique – 
Film theory – 
Film timing – 
Film treatment – 
Filming production roles – 
Filmizing – 
Filter (photography) – 
Final cut privilege – 
Final Cut Pro – 
Fine cut – 
First National Pictures – 
Fisheye lens – 
Flange focal distance – 
Flashing arrow – 
Flatbed editor – 
Flicker fusion threshold – 
F-number – 
Focal length – 
Focus (optics) – 
Focus puller – 
Focusing screen – 
Foley artist – 
Follow focus – 
Follow shot – 
Followspot light – 
Forced perspective – 
Foreshadowing – 
Formalist film theory – 
Found footage – 
Fourth wall – 
Frame – 
Frame composition – 
Frame rate – 
Frazier lens – 
Freeze frame shot – 
French hours – 
French Impressionist Cinema – 
Fresnel lantern – 
Fresnel lens – 
F-stop – 
Full frame – 
Full shot

G
Gaffer – 
Gaffer tape – 
Garbage matte – 
Genesis – 
Genie Award – 
Genres – 
German Expressionism – 
Gobo (lighting) – 
Go motion – 
Godspot effect – 
Golden Globe Awards – 
Greenlight – 
Greensman – 
Grip –

H
Hand-held camera – 
Hard light – 
Head-on shot – 
Heterodiegetic – 
High-angle shot – 
High camera angle – 
High Definition – 
High-intensity discharge lamp – 
High-key lighting – 
High speed camera – 
History of cinema – 
Hollywood – 
Hollywood accounting – 
Hollywood cycles – 
Hollywood North – 
HandBrake – 
The Hollywood Reporter – 
Home video – 
Horror film – 
Hydrargyrum Medium-Arc Iodide lamp – 
Hyperfocal distance –

I
IATSE – 
Image processing – 
IMAX – 
iMovie – 
In-camera effect –
Independent film – 
Industrial Light and Magic – 
Insert – 
Intellectual montage – 
Intelligent lighting – 
Interlace – 
Intermittent mechanism – 
Internet Movie Database – 
Interruptible foldback – 
Intertitle – 
Iris-in/ Iris-out – 
Iso-elastic – 
Italian neorealism –

J
Jaggies – 
Jib – 
Jump cut – 
Juxtaposition (editing) –

K
Key costumer – 
Key grip – 
Key light – 
Keying (graphics) – 
Keykode – 
Kinemacolor – 
Kinetoscope – 
Kino-Pravda – 
Kinopanorama – 
Klieg light – 
Kodak Theatre – 
Kuleshov Effect –

L
L cut (split edit) – 
LCD shutter glasses – 
Lead space – 
Lekolite – 
Lens – 
Lens flare – 
Lens hood – 
Letterboxing – 
Light meter – 
Light reflector – 
Lighting technician – 
Lighting – 
Lighting control console – 
Lighting design – 
LightWave – 
Lightworks – 
Limato, Ed – 
Line producer – 
Linear filter – 
Linear timecode – 
Linear video editing – 
Lip flap – 
Lipstick camera – 
Live soundtrack – 
Location – 
Location manager – 
Location scouting – 
Location shooting – 
Log line – 
Long shot – 
Long take – 
Low-angle shot – 
Low-key lighting – 
Lucasfilm – 
Lucasfilm Animation – 
Lumapanel – 
Luminaire

M
Machinima – 
Magic lantern – 
Make-up artist – 
Make-up call – 
Marxist film theory – 
Master shot – 
Match cut – 
Match moving – 
Matte – 
Maya – 
Medieval film – 
Medium shot – 
Medium-long shot – 
Method acting – 
Method filmmaking – 
Metro-Goldwyn-Mayer – 
Microphone – 
Microphone boom – 
Mid shot – 
MIDI timecode – 
Mini35 – 
Mise en scene – 
Mixing console – 
Mockumentary – 
Montage – 
Mood lighting – 
Motion blur – 
Motion capture – 
Motion picture – 
Motion Picture Association – 
Motion Picture Association – Canada – 
Motion picture camera – 
Motion picture continuity – 
Motion picture distribution – 
Motion picture editing – 
Motion picture lighting – 
Motion picture rating system – 
Motion picture terminology – 
Movie projector – 
Movie star – 
Movie studio – 
Movie theater – 
Movies Filmed in Harlem – 
Movietone sound system – 
Moving light – 
Moviola – 
MPAA film rating system – 
Multicamera setup – 
Multiplane camera – 
Music editor – 
Music supervisor – 
Musical film

N
Narrative film – 
Narrativity – 
National Association of Theatre Owners – 
National Film Board of Canada – 
National Film Preservation Board – 
National Film Registry – 
National Media Museum – 
Negative cutting – 
Negative pickup deal – 
Neo-noir – 
Neorealism – 
New Queer Cinema – 
Newsreel – 
Nickelodeon movie theater – 
Night for day – 
Night for night – 
Nitrocellulose – 
Noise reduction – 
Non-diegetic insert – 
Non-linear editing – 
Normal lens –

O
Oblique camera angle – 
Offline editing – 
Oktoskop – 
On Location – 
One-light – 
Online editing – 
OpenEXR – 
Open content film – 
Opening credits – 
Optical composition – 
Optical effects – 
Optical printer – 
Optical zoom – 
Original camera negative – 
Orphan film – 
Outtake

P
The Paley Center for Media – 
Pan and scan – 
Pan shot – 
Panavision – 
Panchromatic – 
PAR light – 
Paramount Pictures – 
Performance capture – 
Persistence of vision – 
Perspective distortion – 
Phi phenomenon – 
Photographic film – 
Photographic lens – 
Photometry – 
Pinnacle Liquid Edition – 
Pinnacle Studio – 
Pincushion distortion – 
Pinscreen animation – 
Pitch – 
Pixar – 
Pixilation – 
Plot development (motion picture) – 
Point of view shot – 
Political Cinema – 
Pool hall lighting – 
Pop filter – 
Pornographic movie – 
Post-production – 
PowerAnimator – 
Practical effects – 
Practical lighting – 
Praxinoscope – 
Premium Picture Productions – 
Pre-production – 
Principal photography – 
Producer – 
Producers Guild of America – 
Production assistant – 
Production Code – 
Production company – 
Production design (motion picture) – 
Production designer – 
Production sound mixer – 
Production values – 
Progressive scan – 
Proof of concept – 
Propaganda film – 
Prop – 
Property master – 
Psychoanalytic film theory – 
Publicist – 
PV mount –

R
Rack focus – 
Raster image – 
Reaction shot – 
Read-through – 
Re-can – 
Recording mixer – 
Redress – 
Reflected light – 
Refractive index – 
Reframing – 
Remake – 
Rembrandt lighting – 
Rendering – 
Re-recording mixer – 
Retrofocus – 
Reversal film – 
Reverse-angle shot – 
RGB color model – 
Rig – 
Rostrum camera – 
Rotary disc shutter – 
Rotoscoping – 
Rough cut – 
Rule of thirds – 
Runaway production – 
Rushes – 
Rushes log

S
Sa–Sm

Scene axis – 
Scene lighting – 
Scoop lights – 
Screen Actors Guild – 
Screen direction – 
Screen test – 
Screenplay – 
Screenplay slug line – 
Screenwriter – 
Screenwriting – 
Screenwriting software – 
Screenwriting credit – 
Screwball comedy film – 
Scrim (lighting) – 
Script – 
Script breakdown – 
Script doctor – 
Script Supervisor – 
Second unit – 
Secondary animation – 
Sellmeier equation – 
Sequence (filming) – 
Sequence shot – 
Serial – 
Set (film and TV scenery) –
Set construction – 
Set costumer – 
Set decorator – 
Set dresser – 
Shake (software) – 
Shallow focus – 
Shaw Brothers Studio – 
Shooting ratio – 
Shooting script – 
Short end – 
Short film – 
Shot (filming) – 
Shot reverse shot – 
Shutter angle – 
Shutter speed – 
Silent film – 
Simultaneous release – 
Single camera setup – 
Skywalker Sound – 
Slit-scan – 
Slow cutting – 
Slow motion – 
SMPTE – 
SMPTE color bars – 
SMPTE time code

Sn–Sz

Snoot (lighting) – 
Society of Motion Picture and Television Engineers – 
Soft light – 
Sony Pictures – 
Sony Vegas – 
Sound designer – 
Sound dissolve – 
Sound editor – 
Sound effects – 
Sound effects editor – 
Sound engineer – 
Sound mix – 
Sound recording – 
Sound stage – 
Soundtrack – 
Soviet movies of the year by ticket sales – 
Star Wars – 
Special effects – 
Specular light – 
Split screen – 
Spotlight (lighting) – 
Spydercam – 
Stage combat – 
Stage lighting – 
Stage lighting instrument – 
Stand-in – 
Standoff – 
Step outline – 
Stereoscopy – 
Stock footage – 
Stop motion – 
Stop trick – 
Striplight – 
Strobing effect – 
Structuralist film theory – 
Stunt work – 
Stuntmen's Association of Motion Pictures – 
Subjective camera angle –
Subtitle – 
Sundance Institute – 
Sungun lamp – 
Superimpose – 
Surround sound – 
Suspension of disbelief – 
Swing gang – 
Sync-coding – 
Synchronizer – 
Sync sound –

T 
Talkies – 
Talking head – 
Tally light – 
Technical achievement – 
Technicolor – 
Technirama – 
Techniscope – 
Telecine – 
Teleconverter – 
Telerecording – 
Television movie – 
Tessar formula – 
Test screening – 
Three-point lighting – 
Tight shot – 
Tilt – 
Time-lapse – 
Title sequence – 
Top grossing movie – 
Top-grossing movies in the United States – 
Toronto International Film Festival – 
Tracking shot – 
Trailer – 
Transgender in film and television – 
Transition focus – 
Transitional effect – 
Treatment – 
Trilogy – 
Trucking shot – 
Tungsten fresnel light – 
Tungsten open face light – 
Two-shot –

U
Undercranking – 
Universal Studios – 
Utilitarian lighting – 
Utility sound technician –

V

Varicam – 
Variety – 
Venice Film Festival – 
Vertical interval timecode – 
Video – 
Video assist – 
Video tap – 
Viewfinder – 
Vignetting – 
Vinegar syndrome – 
Virtual camera – 
VistaVision – 
Visual effects – 
Vitascope – 
Voice actor – 
Voice director

W
Walla – 
Walt Disney Company – 
Wardrobe attendant – 
Wardrobe design – 
Wardrobe designer – 
Warner Brothers – 
WGA screenwriting credit system – 
Wide-angle lens – 
Widelux – 
Widescreen – 
Wipe – 
Wire frame model – 
Wire removal – 
Wireless microphone – 
Women's Cinema – 
Workprint – 
Writers Guild of America –

X
Xenon arc lamp – 
Xenon flash lamp – 
X-rated –

Z
Zeiss Tessar lens – 
Zen filmmaking – 
Zoetrope – 
Zoom lens – 
Zoopraxiscope –

See also 
 Outline of film

Film-related lists